Pishkamar (also Romanized as Pīshkamar and Pīsh Kamar; also known as Tekcha) is a village in Zavkuh Rural District, Pishkamar District, Kalaleh County, Golestan Province, Iran. At the 2006 census, its population was 2,632, in 614 families.

References 

Populated places in Kalaleh County